Joseph Godbout (May 12, 1850 – April 1, 1923) was a physician and political figure in Quebec. He represented Beauce in the House of Commons of Canada from 1887 to 1901 as an independent Liberal and then Liberal member. He sat for La Salle division in the Senate of Canada from 1901 to 1923.

He was born in St-Vital de Lambton, Beauce County, Canada East, the son of Joseph Godbout. Godbout was educated at the Séminaire de Quebec and the Université Laval. He was married twice: to Rachel Audet in 1878 and, after his first wife's death, to Hermine Fauteux (née St-Pierre). Godbout was mayor of St-François in 1898.  He was named to the Senate by Sir Wilfrid Laurier on April 4, 1901. Godbout died in office at the age of 72.

His step-grandson Gaspard Fauteux also served as a member of the House of Commons.

References 
 
The Canadian parliamentary companion, 1891 JA Gemmill

1850 births
1923 deaths
Liberal Party of Canada MPs
Members of the House of Commons of Canada from Quebec
Canadian senators from Quebec
Mayors of places in Quebec